The 2014 Mercer Bears football team represented Mercer University in the 2014 NCAA Division I FCS football season. They were led by second-year head coach Bobby Lamb and played their home games at the Moye Complex. They were first-year members of the Southern Conference (SoCon). They finished the season 6–6 overall and 1–6 in SoCon play to tie for seventh place.

Schedule

The ASN game aired locally on WMUB.

Awards
2014 CFPA FCS National Return Specialist of the Year
Chandler Curtis

Honors

All-America
Second Team
Chandler Curtis

All-SoCon
The Mercer University football team had seven individuals honored by the Southern Conference:
First Team
Chandler Curtis
Alex Lakes
Second Team
Wilson Heres
Alex Avant
Tyler Ward
All-Freshman
Chandler Curtis
Alex Lakes
Austin Barrett
Kyle Williams

References

Mercer
Mercer Bears football seasons
Mercer Bears football